Southport is a town in Chemung County, New York, United States. The population was 9,684 according to the 2020 census. The town is located in the southwestern corner of Chemung County and is southwest of the city of Elmira. It is part of the Elmira Metropolitan Statistical Area.

History 

The area was first settled circa 1788. The town of Southport was formed from the town of Elmira in 1822. In 1867, an eastern section of the town was used to form part of the new town of Ashland.

Geography

The southern town line is the border of Pennsylvania, and the western town boundary is the border of Steuben County. The Chemung River, a tributary of the Susquehanna River, forms part of the northern border.

New York State Route 14 and New York State Route 328 are north-south highways that intersect in Southport village.

Demographics

As of the census of 2000, there were 11,185 people, 4,189 households, and 2,890 families residing in the town.  The population density was 240.4 people per square mile (92.8/km2).  There were 4,353 housing units at an average density of 93.6 per square mile (36.1/km2).  The racial makeup of the town was 90.55% White, 6.78% Black or African American, 0.19% Native American, 0.23% Asian, 0.04% Pacific Islander, 1.47% from other races, and 0.75% from two or more races. Hispanic or Latino of any race were 2.91% of the population.

There were 4,189 households, out of which 28.6% had children under the age of 18 living with them, 54.7% were married couples living together, 10.4% had a female householder with no husband present, and 31.0% were non-families. 26.2% of all households were made up of individuals, and 12.3% had someone living alone who was 65 years of age or older.  The average household size was 2.42 and the average family size was 2.89.

In the town, the population was spread out, with 21.2% under the age of 18, 8.1% from 18 to 24, 29.3% from 25 to 44, 24.6% from 45 to 64, and 16.7% who were 65 years of age or older.  The median age was 40 years. For every 100 females, there were 109.1 males.  For every 100 females age 18 and over, there were 111.2 males.

The median income for a household in the town was $38,580, and the median income for a family was $44,232. Males had a median income of $32,144 versus $24,410 for females. The per capita income for the town was $18,454.  About 8.7% of families and 11.7% of the population were below the poverty line, including 18.5% of those under age 18 and 4.2% of those age 65 or over.

Communities and locations in Town of Southport 
Bulkhead – A former community in the town.
Mudlick Creek – A stream flowing out the western side of the town.
Mount Zoar – A prominent hill in the northern part of the town.
Pine City – A hamlet between Southport village and Webb Mills on NY-328. The name is from the large number of pine trees.
Rosstown – A location south of Southport on County Road 26.
Sagetown – A location near the western town line on County Road 36 and Mudlick Creek.
Seeley Creek – (1) A stream that flows northward through the town to the Chemung River, (2) A hamlet south of Webb Mills on NY-328.  The name is that of an early settler family.
Southport – The hamlet of Southport is in the northeastern part of the town, located on NY-14, and is also a suburb of Elmira.
Webb Mills – A hamlet in the south central part of the town and north of Seeley Creek on NY-328.

References

External links
 Town of Southport official website
 Tri-Counties Genealogy & History: Town of Southport, Chemung County NY

Towns in Chemung County, New York